The 2022 United States House of Representatives elections in Wisconsin were held on November 8, 2022, to elect the eight U.S. representatives from the state of Wisconsin, one from each of the state's eight congressional districts. The elections coincided with other elections to the House of Representatives, elections to the United States Senate, and various state and local elections. Primaries were held on August 9, 2022.

Results summary

Statewide

District
Results of the 2022 United States House of Representatives elections in Wisconsin by district:

District 1

The 1st district encompasses Janesville, Kenosha, and Racine.The incumbent is Republican Bryan Steil, who has represented the district since 2019 and was re-elected with 59.3% of the vote in 2020.

Republican primary

Candidates

Nominee
Bryan Steil, incumbent U.S. Representative

Primary results

Democratic primary

Candidates

Nominee
Ann Roe, businesswoman and activist

Endorsements

Primary results

Independents

Candidates

Declared 
Charles Barman

General election

Predictions

Results

District 2

The 2nd congressional district covers Dane County, Iowa County, Lafayette County, Sauk County and Green County, as well as portions of Richland County and Rock County. The district includes Madison, the state's capital, its suburbs and some of the surrounding areas. The incumbent is Democrat Mark Pocan, who was elected with 69.7% of the vote in 2020.

Democratic primary

Candidates

Nominee
Mark Pocan, incumbent U.S. Representative

Endorsements

Primary results

Republican primary

Candidates

Nominee
Erik Olsen, attorney

Eliminated in primary
Charity Barry, businesswoman

Failed to qualify
Daniel Theron, Republican nominee for this district in 2020, 2016, 2014 and 2008

Primary results

Independents

Candidates

Declared
Douglas Alexander

General election

Predictions

Results

District 3

The 3rd district takes in the Driftless Area in southwestern Wisconsin including Eau Claire and La Crosse. The incumbent is Democrat Ron Kind, who was reelected with 51.3% of the vote in 2020. On August 10, 2021, Kind announced his retirement.

Democratic primary

Candidates

Nominee
Brad Pfaff, state senator

Eliminated in primary
Rebecca Cooke, businesswoman
Deb McGrath, former Army Captain and CIA officer
 Mark Neumann, La Crosse City Council Member, retired pediatrician, and candidate for this district in 2020

Withdrew
Brett Knudsen, podcast host and U.S Navy veteran

Declined
Ron Kind, incumbent U.S. Representative

Endorsements

Primary results

Republican primary

Candidates

Nominee
Derrick Van Orden, retired Navy SEAL and nominee for this district in 2020

Withdrawn
Denise Hurless

Endorsements

Primary results

General election

Predictions

Polling

Deb McGrath vs. Derrick Van Orden

Generic Democrat vs. generic Republican

Results

District 4

The 4th district encompasses Milwaukee County, taking in the city of Milwaukee and its working-class suburbs of Cudahy, St. Francis, South Milwaukee, and West Milwaukee, as well as the North Shore communities of Glendale, Shorewood, Whitefish Bay, Fox Point, Bayside, and Brown Deer. The incumbent is Democrat Gwen Moore, who was reelected with 74.7% of the vote in 2020.

Democratic primary

Candidates

Nominee
Gwen Moore, incumbent U.S. Representative

Endorsements

Primary results

Republican primary

Candidates

Nominee
 Tim Rogers, nominee for this district in 2020

Eliminated in primary
 Travis Clark

Primary results

Independents

Candidates

Declared
Robert Raymond

General election

Predictions

Results

District 5

The 5th district takes in the northern and western suburbs of Milwaukee, including Washington County, Jefferson County, as well as most of Waukesha County. The incumbent is Republican Scott Fitzgerald, who was elected with 60.1% of the vote in 2020.

Republican primary

Candidates

Nominee
Scott Fitzgerald, incumbent U.S. Representative

Primary results

Democratic primary

Candidates

Nominee
Mike Van Someren, attorney

Failed to qualify 
Ronald Remmel, medical electronics manufacturer and college professor

Withdrawn
 Jessica Katzenmeyer (Running for State Senate)

Endorsements

Primary results

General election

Predictions

Endorsements

Results

District 6

The 6th district is based in east-central Wisconsin, encompassing part of the Fox River Valley, and takes in Fond du Lac, Oshkosh, and Sheboygan. The incumbent is Republican Glenn Grothman, who was reelected with 59.2% of the vote in 2020.

Republican primary

Candidates

Nominee
Glenn Grothman, incumbent U.S. Representative

Eliminated in primary
Douglas Mullenix, management consultant

Primary results

Democratic primary

Candidates

Failed to qualify
Amy Washburn, attorney

General election

Predictions

Results

District 7

The 7th district is located in northwestern Wisconsin and includes Wausau and Superior. The incumbent is Republican Tom Tiffany, who was reelected with 60.7% of the vote in 2020.

Republican primary

Candidates

Nominee
Tom Tiffany, incumbent U.S. Representative

Eliminated in primary
David Kunelius, teacher

Primary results

Democratic primary

Candidates

Nominee
 Richard Ausman, businessman

Primary results

General election

Predictions

Results

District 8

The 8th district encompasses northeastern Wisconsin, including Green Bay and Appleton. The incumbent is Republican Mike Gallagher, who was reelected with 64.2% of the vote in 2020.

Republican primary

Candidates

Nominee
Mike Gallagher, incumbent U.S. Representative

Eliminated in primary
Shaun Clarmont

Endorsements

Primary results

Democratic primary

Candidates

Failed to qualify
Rahb Kettleson, truck driver

Libertarian primary

Nominee 
Jacob VandenPlas, farmer

Independents

Declared 
Paul Boucher

General election

Predictions

Results

Notes 

Partisan clients

References

External links 
Official campaign websites for 1st district candidates
Ann Roe (D) for Congress
Bryan Steil (R) for Congress

Official campaign website for 2nd district candidates
Charity Barry (R) for Congress
Mark Pocan (D) for Congress
Daniel Theron (R) for Congress

Official campaign websites for 3rd district candidates
Brad Pfaff (D) for Congress
Derrick Van Orden (R) for Congress

Official campaign websites for 4th district candidates
Gwen Moore (D) for Congress
Tim Rogers (R) for Congress

Official campaign websites for 5th district candidates
Scott Fitzgerald (R) for Congress
Mike Van Someren (D) for Congress

Official campaign websites for 6th district candidates
Douglas Mullenix (R) for Congress
Amy Washburn (D) for Congress

Official campaign websites for 8th district candidates
Dick Ausman (D) for Congress
Tom Tiffany (R) for Congress

2022
Wisconsin
United States House of Representatives